Cutler is an unincorporated community in Democrat Township, Carroll County, Indiana, United States. It is part of the Lafayette, Indiana Metropolitan Statistical Area.

Geography

History
The town was laid out by John A. Cook during the construction of the Logansport Crawfordsville & Southwestern Rail Road sometime in 1871. It was named by him, probably from the man in charge of the construction, William P. Cutler.

The first post office at Cutler was established in 1873.

Education
Cutler residents may obtain a library card at the Burlington Community Library in Burlington.

Notable people
Hugh Lowery, NFL football player, was born in Cutler.
Jillian Kennedy, notable philanthropy professional.
Cindy L Harmon Grier, Author of Crokars a children's book

References

Unincorporated communities in Carroll County, Indiana
Unincorporated communities in Indiana
Lafayette metropolitan area, Indiana